In complex geometry, the term positive form refers to several classes of real differential forms of Hodge type (p, p).

(1,1)-forms 
Real (p,p)-forms on a complex manifold M are forms which are of type (p,p) and real, that is, lie in the intersection  A real (1,1)-form  is called semi-positive (sometimes just positive), respectively, positive (or positive definite) if any of the following equivalent conditions holds:

 is the imaginary part of a positive semidefinite (respectively, positive definite) Hermitian form.
For any (1,0)-tangent vector ,  (respectively).
For any real tangent vector ,  (respectively), where  is the complex structure operator.

Positive line bundles 

In algebraic geometry, positive definite (1,1)-forms arise as curvature forms of ample line bundles (also known as positive line bundles). Let L be a holomorphic Hermitian line bundle on a complex manifold,

its complex structure operator. Then L is equipped with a unique connection preserving the Hermitian structure and satisfying

.

This connection is called the Chern connection.

The curvature  of the Chern connection is always a
purely imaginary (1,1)-form. A line bundle L is called positive if  is a positive (1,1)-form. The Kodaira embedding theorem claims that a positive line bundle is ample, and conversely, any ample line bundle admits a Hermitian metric with  positive.

Positivity for (p, p)-forms 

Semi-positive (1,1)-forms on M form a convex cone. When M is a compact complex surface, this cone is self-dual, with respect to the Poincaré pairing :

For (p, p)-forms, where , there are two different notions of positivity. A form is called
strongly positive if it is a linear combination of products of semi-positive forms, with positive real coefficients. A real (p, p)-form  on an n-dimensional complex manifold M is called weakly positive if for all strongly positive (n-p, n-p)-forms ζ with compact support, we have .

Weakly positive and strongly positive forms form convex cones. On compact manifolds these cones are dual with respect to the Poincaré pairing.

References 

P. Griffiths and J. Harris (1978), Principles of Algebraic Geometry, Wiley. 
J.-P. Demailly, L2 vanishing theorems for positive line bundles and adjunction theory, Lecture Notes of a CIME course on "Transcendental Methods of Algebraic Geometry" (Cetraro, Italy, July 1994).

Complex manifolds
Algebraic geometry
Differential forms